Chulym (in Chulym: Ось тили, Ös tili; Russian: Чулымский язык), also known as Chulim, Chulym-Turkic (not to be confused with the Turkic Siberian Tatar language), is the language of the Chulyms. The names which the people use to refer to themselves are 1. пистиҥ кишилер, pistɪŋ kiʃɪler (our people) and 2. ось кишилер, øs kiʃɪler (Ös people). The native designation for the language are ось тил(и), øs til(ɪ) ~ ø:s til(ɪ), and less frequently тадар тил(и), tadar til(ɪ).

The language is spoken in Russia, at various locations along the Chulym River.

Classification
The Chulym language was considered to belong to the Siberian Turkic group of Turkic languages that also includes Khakas, Shor and Saryg-Yughur languages.
Nogorodov, et al. argue that Chulym is of Kipchak origins, based on the Leipzig-Jakarta list. This comparison shows that 87 of the 100 items match the Kipchak items, whereas only 67 are cognate to Oghuz Turkic.

History
Chulym was once a widely spoken language but its history consists of "multiple waves of colonization and linguistic assimilation first into Turkic, and now into Russian". This shift becomes even more evident when one studies the structure of the language, which is distinguishable from other Siberian Turkic languages. Now, Middle Chulym has become endangered due to the Russian hostility that occurred during the mid-twentieth century. It was during the 1940s, when Joseph Stalin was in power, that there was an establishment of a program called "the second mother tongue policy". This included the act of rounding up children and sending them to boarding schools, where they learned the nation's language and were forced not to speak their own native tongue. The program quickly caused the community to abandon the Chulym language. Soon enough, the language became associated with negative connotations and thus it gained an inferior and low social status. According to the film, The Linguists, a Chulym native speaker, Vasya, claimed that "Chulym was viewed as a 'gutter language'," and the language was no longer passed on to the children. Furthermore, in the 1970s, the Chulym community was forced into Russian-speaking settlements, where they had to adapt and speak the Russian language in order to move up in the social ladder and have greater chances of economic prosperity. Soon enough, Chulym speakers were abandoning their native tongue; this caused the community to lose a great number of speakers and their language traditions. Not only were the Chulym people forced to abandon their language, but also the government dropped them from the census statistics as a distinct ethnic group after 1959. Under the eyes of the government, the Chulym population was seen as non-existent, and not enough to earn itself a place as a different national unit; it was not until 1999 that the community regained their status as a separate ethnic entity. Thus with Russia's urbanization and domination of their national language, Chulym's chances of survival were slim.

Geographic distribution 
The language is closely related to the Shor and Khakas languages. Though all these are considered by some as one language, the Ös speakers themselves do not believe this to be the case.

Chulym comprises two distinct dialects with multiple sub-dialects, corresponding to locations along the Chulym River. The native ethnonym is given in italics.
 Lower Chulym (now believed extinct)
 Küärik, küärik jon (Koryukovskaya volost)
 Ketsik (Kurchikova volost)
 Yezhi, je:ži jon (Baygul'skaya volost)
 Yatsi, jatsi jon (Yachinskaya volost)
 Chibi, tš'ibi d'on (Kyzyldeyeva volost)
 Middle Chulym
 Tutal, tutaɫ tš'onu (Tutal'skaya volost, Teguldetsky District, Tomsk Oblast)
 Melet, pilet tš'onu (Meletskaya volost, Tyukhtetsky District, Krasnoyarsk Krai)
The "Upper Chulym dialect" identified by Harrison & Anderson is in fact the Melet sub-dialect of Middle Chulym. The Chulym-Turkic language is a geographical, rather than a linguistic term. In its diachronic perspective, it comprised a (sub-)dialectal continuum with the neighboring (sub-)dialects showing only slight differentiation, while those at the extremes or the periphery of the area were rather mutually unintelligible.

Chulym is a moribund language and will most likely be extinct by the 2030s. It is listed in the UNESCO Red Book of Endangered Languages. During the filming of the 2008 American documentary film The Linguists, linguists Greg Anderson and K. David Harrison interviewed and recorded 20 speakers and estimated there may be between 35 and 40 fluent speakers out of a community of overall 426 members. The youngest fluent speaker was 54 at the time of filming. Lemskaya mentions that this person seems to be the youngest speaker of the Tutal dialect, whereas she has found speakers in their late 40s of the Melet dialect (which Anderson & Harrison call 'Upper Chulym').

The speakers are located in Russia, in southwestern Siberia, north of the Altay Mountains, in the basin of the Chulym River, a tributary of the Ob River. Ös speakers reside primarily in Belij Yar, Novoshumilovo, Ozyornoe, and Teguldet, in eastern Tomsk Oblast and Pasechnoe in western Krasnoyarsk Kray. All speakers are bilingual in Russian. In Soviet times, speakers of the language suffered as children were discouraged from or punished for using the language in schools, in a process of language devalorization.

Documentation
The fact that Chulym had no written indigenous tradition, made it even more difficult for the language to endure. It was not until David Harrison and Greg Anderson from the documentary The Linguists, that they began using scientific methods to document the Chulym language. The two linguists highlighted the efforts made to preserve the Chulym language and record what language loss meant to the community. The two travel to Tegl'det, a small village where they were able to find three Chulym speakers. It was there that they met Vasya, who was the youngest native Chulym speaker at the time. Their process of documentation included sitting down in private with the speakers and recording them during the interview. Accordingly, in collaboration with Vasya and the other two speakers, the two linguists were able to list words in Chulym such as numbers, greetings, a wool-spinning song, aphorisms, and bear- and moose-hunting stories. They were also able to collect personal narratives, spontaneous conversations, body parts, colors, fauna, flora and kin terms, along with instructions on how to use certain tools such as fur-covered skis and wooden canoes. They also asked the natives to interpret specific sentences, with the intention to identify some of the rules of Chulym grammar. With this, the linguists battled to offset the negative connotations of and attitudes towards the Chulym language.

Phonology

Consonants 
The following table lists the consonants of Chulym, dialectal variations are marked: MC = Middle Chulym dialect, LC = Lower Chulym dialect, K = Küärik subdialect of LC. No data was available for the other dialects. The table was derived from Dul'zon and Pomorska.

[q] is an allophone of /k/ in back-vowel words. /h/ is only found medially and finally, it is the result of secondary spirantization. The phonetic value of /v/ is uncertain, but Dul'zon lists it as bilabial /β/. Dul'zon also includes voiceless nasal /m̥/ and voiceless liquids /r̥/ and /l̥/, these are not found in the more recent publication of Pomorska.

Morphology and syntax

Pronouns

Aktionsart 
Like many other Turkic languages, Chulym expresses aktionsart through auxiliary verbs. Polyverbal constructions with actionable characteristics can express "state" (S), "process" (P), "entering a state" (ES), "entering a process" (EP) and "multiplicative process" (MP). This is recognized as universal in Turkic languages. S, P, ES and EP reflect episodic actions, whereas MP are habitual. ES and EP only seem to occur in the perfective aspect, while the others occur in both perfective and imperfective.

Syntax 
Chulym uses SOV word order and post-positions, just like many of the neighboring Turkic and Tatar languages.

Vocabulary 
As its speakers lose more and more knowledge of their language because of the language devalorization process described above, Chulym has borrowed a large amount of Russian words in recent years. Most commonly, interjections and discourse markers are borrowed from Russian, in addition to concepts that have no corresponding Chulym words.

Writing system

References

External links

 'The Linguists': Raiders of the Lost Tongues ("I have always loved the Chulym language.")
 
  
 Язык чулымских тюрков 
 Информация о чулымцах на сайте Совета Федерации 
 Информация на narodru.ru 
 Чулымцы возрождают родной язык 

Agglutinative languages
Siberian Turkic languages
Languages of Russia
Endangered Turkic languages
Turkic languages